1800 in philosophy

Events

Publications 
 Edmund Burke's Thoughts and Details on Scarcity (published posthumously)
 Johann Gottlieb Fichte's The Vocation of Man
 Elizabeth Hamilton's fictionalised Memoirs of Modern Philosophers
 Immanuel Kant's , prepared by Gottlob Benjamin Jäsche
 Friedrich Wilhelm Joseph Schelling's System of Transcendental Idealism

Births

Deaths

References 

Philosophy
18th-century philosophy
Philosophy by year